Sam Fishburn (born 26 November 2003) is an English professional footballer who plays as a forward for  club Carlisle United.

Career
Born in Gateshead, Fishburn joined Carlisle United's youth team in 2020 and, following a prolific season with the club's under-18 side, he signed a two-year senior contract in summer 2021 with a further one-year option. On 17 August 2021, Fishburn joined Northern Premier League Premier Division club Lancaster City on loan until January 2022. After 8 goals in 9 matches for Lancaster City, he was recalled by Carlisle in late September. He made his debut for Carlisle on 28 September 2021 as a substitute against Everton U21 in the EFL Trophy, and made his league debut off the bench the following month in a 2–2 draw away to Newport County.

On 28 July 2022, Fishburn joined National League North club Blyth Spartans for a three-month loan deal. On 12 September 2022, days after his loan spell at Blyth came to an end, he joined Northern Premier League Premier Division side Morpeth Town on a loan-deal until the end of the season, with a recall option after 28 days. Morpeth had previously tried to sign Fishburn in pre-season, but Carlisle felt like the loan move to Blyth would be a better option.

References

External links

2003 births
Living people
English footballers
Footballers from Gateshead
Association football forwards
Carlisle United F.C. players
Lancaster City F.C. players
Blyth Spartans A.F.C. players
Morpeth Town A.F.C. players
English Football League players
National League (English football) players
Northern Premier League players